Deadline Music is a record sub-label wholly owned and operated by Cleopatra Records. Deadline was founded at the turn of the century during a revival of 1980s glam/hair metal bands in which there were new albums from Quiet Riot, White Lion, Warrant, Cinderella, Bret Michaels, and L.A. Guns. The label produced a series of compilations, including This Is Hair Metal, More '80s Hair Metal, and the box set Hollywood Rocks!.

Deadline released an album by Queensrÿche in April 2013. The band had split into two factions with founding vocalist/frontman Geoff Tate leading a new group of musicians while the remaining members carried on with a new vocalist. Dubbed "The Heaviest Rÿche Ever", Tate's version of the band included longtime guitarist Kelly Gray plus Quiet Riot bassist Rudy Sarzo and AC/DC drummer Simon Wright. This group recorded and released Frequency Unknown. Los Angeles hard-rockers Bulletboys also released a new album, Elefanté, in 2015
	
In 2014, Deadline teamed with Canadian Thor for deluxe edition reissues of his early albums on both CD and vinyl, including 1985's Only the Strong, 1982's Lighting Strikes Again, and the 1977 debut album Keep the Dogs Away. Metal Avenger, Thor's first album of new material for Deadline, arrived in 2016, and included guest appearances by Henry Rollins, Fast Eddie Clarke, Cheetah Chrome, and Jay Jay French.

In 2016, Deadline released a deluxe box set by Twisted Sister consisting of previously unreleased live performances from the band's early days.

In 2018, Deadline released newcomers Kore Rozzik debut record "Vengeance Overdrive ". This marks the first new millennium artist for the label.

Former Cinderella frontman and powerhouse vocalist, Tom Keifer, ascends to new heights on his second solo album, Rise. This collection of 11 brand new songs rock with a fury and passion that is sure to make critics and fans take notice. Two brand new concept videos for the standout single “The Death Of Me” and the uplifting title track “Rise” produced by Vicente & Fernando Cordero of Industrialism Films. Also features the moving ballad “You Believe In Me” written by Tom for his wife Savannah.

See also
 List of record labels

References

External links
 Official website
 Official Twitter
 discogs.com
 YouTube

American independent record labels
Record labels established in 2000